The Squeaky Wheel (a nickname given by radio listeners) is a utility shortwave radio station that broadcasts a distinctive sound. 
From around 2000 until 2008 the station's attention tone was a high-pitched two tone signal that vaguely resembled a squeaky wheel. From 2008 the channel marker changed to two different tones in a short sequence repeated with a short silent gap. The frequencies were 5473 kHz (day) and 3828 kHz (night). Several times voice messages in the format of Strategic Flash Messages have been reported. The exact transmitter site is unknown, but is thought to be near Rostov-on-Don, Russia. The signal strength is not very good in Central Europe and the signal sometimes even disappears for days in the noise.

Other frequencies observed are 3650 kHz, 3815 kHz, 5474 kHz, and 5641 kHz.

The Enigma designation is S32 with S indicating Slavic language. However, from 2000 to 2005 it was designated XSW when voice on the station was unknown.

References

External links
 The Squeaky Wheel on Priyom.org
 The Squeaky Wheel

Numbers stations
Radio stations established in 2000